was a Japanese politician of the Democratic Party of Japan, a member of the House of Councillors in the Diet (national legislature). A native of Fukushima, Fukushima and high school graduate, she worked at TV and radio stations. In 1990, she was elected to the House of Representatives for the first time as a member of the Japan Socialist Party. She lost her seat in 1996 but was elected to the House of Councillors for the first time in 1997.

the 87 Chairperson of the National Public Safety Commission.

References

External links 
  in Japanese.

1944 births
2017 deaths
Members of the House of Representatives (Japan)
Members of the House of Councillors (Japan)
Female members of the House of Representatives (Japan)
Female members of the House of Councillors (Japan)
Social Democratic Party (Japan) politicians
Democratic Party of Japan politicians
People from Fukushima, Fukushima